Xenophrys monticola is a species of frog in the family Megophryidae. It is known from West Bengal and Sikkim, India, as well as Nepal and possibly Bhutan.

References

monticola
Amphibians of India
Amphibians of Nepal
Amphibians described in 1864

Taxa named by Albert Günther